James Gaylyn (born January 9, 1954) is an American-New Zealand actor. He is best known for his appearances in the Power Rangers franchise.

Biography
Gaylyn moved to New Zealand with his New Zealand-born wife in 1981. As a blues singer and drummer, he has toured New Zealand and Australia.

Gaylyn is best known internationally for his work on Power Rangers. He starred as Col. Mason Truman in Power Rangers RPM and has had a number of onscreen and voice-over roles since the show's production relocated to Auckland. His career has also included other international productions, including Avatar and the Netflix series Cowboy Bebop.

Gaylyn lives on the North Shore of Auckland. His son, Elijah, is an aspiring rapper.

Acting career

Voice-over
Power Rangers Dino Thunder (2004) .... Zeltrax / Golden Rod
Power Rangers S.P.D. (2005) .... Orange-Head Krybots / General Benaag / Zeltrax
Power Rangers Operation Overdrive (2007) .... Volcon / Cheetar
Power Rangers Super Megaforce (2014) .... General Peluso

Television
Xena: Warrior Princess (2000) .... Petracles
Atomic Twister (2002, TV Movie) .... Dr. Martin Jennings
You Wish! (2003, TV Movie) .... Mayor
Power Rangers Ninja Storm (2003, "The Samurai's Journey Part II") .... Past Wind Ninja Academy Sensei
Eddie's Million Dollar Cook-Off (2003, TV Movie) .... Longo
Power Rangers S.P.D. (2005) .... Store Manager
Legend of the Seeker (2009) .... Commander Trimack
Power Rangers RPM (2009) .... Colonel Mason Truman
The Pacific (2010) .... Tee
Power Rangers Dino Super Charge (2016) .... Mr. Watkins
Power Rangers Beast Morphers (2020) .... Colonel Mason Truman

Film
The World's Fastest Indian (2005) .... Customs Official
In Her Line of Fire (2006) .... Admiral Winters
Treasure Island Kids: The Battle of Treasure Island (2006) .... Morgan
Wendy Wu: Homecoming Warrior (2006, TV Movie) .... Mr. Medina
Bridge to Terabithia (2007) .... Principal Turner
Avatar (2009) .... Op Center Staff
Mr. Pip (2012) .... Magwitch
X (2022) .... Sheriff Dentler

References

External links

1954 births
Living people
African-American male actors
American expatriates in New Zealand
American expatriate male actors in New Zealand
Male actors from Louisville, Kentucky
21st-century African-American people
20th-century African-American people